The first baseball game in Ireland was held in Dublin in 1874, and it continues to be played by several teams including in the Irish Baseball League. Baseball Ireland is the governing body of baseball on the island of Ireland, covering both Northern Ireland and the Republic of Ireland.

History

The first baseball game in Ireland was played in 1874, when the Boston Red Stockings played the Philadelphia Athletics in Dublin.

In 1942 and 1943, several games were played in Belfast among teams of US servicemen.

The first organized baseball team in Ireland was the Tramore Sea Lions. The Sea Lions were a youth team in Tramore, County Waterford. The team was organized and coached by local businessman Clive Butterworth.

The success of the Tramore Sea Lions in the local community soon led to the creation of the Waterford Walruses, a team based in nearby Waterford City. In 1962, Clive Butterworth brought two United States Air Force baseball teams to Waterford for an exhibition game. The game was played on Waterford GAA grounds. Butterworth also brought baseball to Dublin in the early 1960s, bringing the total number of Irish baseball teams to three. Within a few years, Butterworth’s declining health led to the end of organized baseball in Ireland for nearly three decades.

In 2019, the Irish American Baseball Society and Irish American Baseball Hall of Fame announced the creation of the Clive Butterworth Award. The award recognizes outstanding volunteer service among youth baseball coaches in Ireland.

Ireland's National Baseball Team 

The Irish National Baseball Team has been in existence since 1996 and has taken part in several major baseball tournaments and tours.

Ireland played its first game in international competition in 1996 against the Czech Republic, losing by a score of 23-2. Ireland's national team has won at least one game in every tournament it has entered including 1996, in Kingston upon Hull.

The Emerald Diamond, a documentary film released in 2006, chronicled the history of baseball in Ireland and the Irish National Baseball Team.

Competition
The Irish National Baseball Team won its first bronze medal at the 2004 European Championships in Germany.  In August 2006, the Irish National Baseball Team won the silver medal at the European Championships held in Antwerp, Belgium. They also competed in the European championships held in Vienna in Austria, Stockholm, Karlovac, Abranches, Antwerp, Barcelona and Ljubljana.

In 2018, the team won the gold medal at the European Baseball Championship tournament held at the International Baseball Centre in Ashbourne, County Meath. By winning, the team advanced to the next round of Olympic qualifying in 2019.

Irish Baseball League 

Although the existence of baseball in Ireland is not widely known, the game has been played there since the early 1990s. What began with a few friends playing pickup games on football and rugby fields in Dublin and Greystones, soon grew into a small league.

In the years since, baseball has spread throughout Ireland, and is currently played in Ashbourne, Clones, Cork, Shankhill, Greystones, Dublin and Belfast.

The Irish Baseball League was founded in 1997.  Participating teams come from Dublin, Ashbourne, Belfast, Clones and Greystones. Baseball Ireland is the governing body of baseball on the island of Ireland, covering both Northern Ireland and the Republic of Ireland.

Competing Teams

Youth baseball 
The Irish cadet team (13–18) played in a Dutch tournament held in Alphen aan den Rijn Netherlands. In this competition they came home with a bronze medal but also much experience gained from the club BSC Alphians who won the tournament. Amsterdam Pirates got the runners-up prize.

See also

References

External links
Baseball Ireland Official website (archived 2019)
Belfast Baseball Association (archived 2007)
The Emerald Diamond (archived 2019)
Irish National Team pitcher Cormac Eklof's blog
Register of Irish-born Major League Baseball players

 
Baseball